Breathe is the seventh extended play by American contemporary worship music collective Maverick City Music, which was released via Tribl Records on February 11, 2022. The featured worship leaders on the EP are Joe L Barnes, Maryanne J. George, Dante Bowe, Chandler Moore, and Naomi Raine, backed by the Mav City Gospel Choir, with guest appearances from Jonathan McReynolds, Doe, Israel Houghton, Ahjah Walls, Katie Torwalt, and Todd Dulaney. The EP was produced by Jonathan Jay, Tony Brown, and Harold Brown.

Breathe debuted at number 16 on Billboard's Top Christian Albums Chart and at number four Top Gospel Albums Chart in the United States. It received a nomination for the Grammy Award for Best Contemporary Christian Music Album at the 2023 Grammy Awards.

Background
On February 11, 2022, Maverick City Music released the EP Breathe without prior promotion, in commemoration of Black History Month 2022. The EP contains live and studio versions standout tracks "Breathe," "Joy of the Lord," and "Make It Right," which were taken Jubilee: Juneteenth Edition (2021), as well as three new original recordings.

Accolades

Commercial performance
In the United States, Breathe debuted at number 16 on Top Christian Albums and number on Top Gospel Albums charts dated February 26, 2022.

Track listing

Charts

Weekly charts

Year-end charts

Release history

References

External links
  

2022 EPs
Maverick City Music albums